Gurdas Maan is an Indian playback singer, songwriter and actor mainly associated with Punjabi and Hindi language music and films. He gained national attention in 1980 with the song "Dil Da Mamla Hai". Since then, he had gone on to record over 34 albums and had written over 305 songs. In 2015 he performed on the song "Ki Banu Dunia Da" with Diljit Dosanjh in MTV Coke studio India that was aired in season 4 episode 5 (16 August 2015) on MTV India.

Early life
Maan was born to Gurdev Singh and Tej Kaur in Giddarbaha, Punjab and is a native of the town. He did his initial schooling from Giddarbaha and completed his graduation from DAV college, Malout. He did his Bachelor of Physical education (B.P ed) from Govt. college of physical education Patiala in 1973. Later, he also did his Masters of physical education and met his wife there. 

He was interested in music and mimicry since childhood.

Career
Maan initially worked in the electricity board, a job he was offered by officials he met at a singing event. In 1980, a producer approached him to perform the song "Dil Da Mamla Hai" in DD National.

Awards and honours
Maan is the only Punjabi singer to win the national award for Best Male Playback Singer at 54th National Film Awards for building the entire narrative through his singing of Heer in Waris Shah: Ishq Daa Waaris.
The said film also entered the Academy Awards ( Oscars ) in General Category. The official entry from U.S.A was pioneered by India Waves TV, a San Francisco based media entity on behalf of Golden Palms Entertainment Inc. 

Maan shot to fame with his hit song "Dil Da Mamla Hai." Soon after that came "Mamla Gadbad Hai" and "Chhalla", the latter being the hit film song from the Punjabi film 'Laung Da Lishkara' (1986), which Maan recorded under the music direction of legendary Jagjit Singh.

On other fronts, Maan has starred in blockbuster Bollywood films and has received numerous awards, including the Jury's Award, presented to him by the president of India in 2005. He also sang the popular track, Ki Banu Duniya Da on Coke Studio MTV Season 4 with singer Diljit Dosanjh. The song was released on 15 August 2015 and hit more than 32 million views on YouTube in one week.

In 2009, he won "Best International Album" at the UK Asian Music Awards for Boot Polishan.

In 2017, he won the "Filmfare Award for Living Legend" in the first Filmfare Awards Punjabi event.<ref>{{cite news |title=Jio Filmfare Awards (Punjabi) 2017: Gurdas Maan to Diljit Dosanjh, heres list of winners |url=https://www.tribuneindia.com/news/archive/features/jio-filmfare-awards-punjabi-2017-gurdas-maan-to-diljit-dosanjh-here-s-list-of-winners-385598 |access-date=25 January 2021 |work=Tribune |date=1 April 2017 |language=en}}</ref>

Film
Aside from singing in Punjabi, he is fluent in Hindi, Bengali, Tamil, Haryanvi and Rajasthani. As an actor, he has performed in Punjabi, Hindi and Tamil movies, but he is best known for his starring role in Waris Shah: Ishq Daa Waaris, a depiction of the Punjabi poet Waris Shah during the creation of his epic poem Heer Ranjha, again co-starring Juhi Chawla and Divya Dutta.  He made a special appearance in Veer-Zaara'' with Shah Rukh Khan and Preity Zinta.

Personal life
He is married to Manjeet Maan. They have a son, Gurickk Maan, who is married to actress Simran Kaur Mundi.

At a village near Karnal, Haryana, India on 20 January 2007 Maan was involved in a car accident in which his Range Rover was hit and severely damaged by a truck. Maan escaped with minor injuries on his face, hands, and chest. His driver Ganesh was injured seriously but recovered soon after.

This was the second car accident of two that Gurdas Maan was involved in. The first accident was a head-on collision between Maan's vehicle and a truck on 9 January 2001 at a village near Rupnagar, Punjab. In this accident Maan's driver Tejpal died. Maan later admitted that his driver asked him to wear his seat belt minutes before the accident. Maan believes that if it had not been for his driver's advice, he would have been dead as well. Later he wrote and performed a song "Baithi sade naal savari utter gayi" dedicated to his driver, who was also his good friend.

In a newspaper interview Maan revealed to the Express & Star, that he is an avid supporter of Manchester United football club.

His mother, Tej Kaur, died in 2016.

Discography
Albums

Duo collaboration

Television

Filmography

References

External links

Living people
1957 births
Bhangra (music) musicians
Punjabi-language singers
Punjabi-language lyricists
Singers from Punjab, India
Male artists from Punjab, India
Male actors from Punjab, India
Male actors in Punjabi cinema
Male actors in Tamil cinema
Male actors in Hindi cinema
21st-century Indian male actors
20th-century Indian male actors
Best Male Playback Singer National Film Award winners
Special Mention (feature film) National Film Award winners